This is a list of recipients of the Polar Medal, which is awarded by the Sovereign of the United Kingdom. It was instituted in 1857 as the Arctic Medal and renamed the Polar Medal in 1904.

The years given indicate when the award was announced in the London Gazette, rather than the year of presentation.

A Clasp indicates a subsequent award to a Polar Medal that was awarded earlier.

21st century

2020s

2010s

2000s

20th century

1990s

1980s

1970s

1960s

1950s

1940s

1930s

1910s

1900s

References

Recipients of the Polar Medal